1993 in television may refer to:

1993 in Albanian television
1993 in American television
1993 in Australian television
1993 in Austrian television
1993 in Belgian television
1993 in Brazilian television
1993 in British television
1993 in Canadian television
1993 in Croatian television
1993 in Danish television
1993 in Dutch television
1993 in French television
1993 in Irish television
1993 in Israeli television
1993 in Japanese television
1993 in New Zealand television
1993 in Norwegian television
1993 in Philippine television
1993 in Portuguese television
1993 in Scottish television
1993 in South African television
1993 in Swedish television